Scoparia aequipennalis is a species of moth in the family Crambidae. It is found on the Azores.

The wingspan is about 16 mm. The forewings are almost wholly suffused with blackish fuscous with two whitish lines. The hindwings are dark fuscous. Adults have been recorded from March to May.

References

Moths described in 1905
Scorparia